BURN-E (stylized as BURN·E)  is a 2008 American computer animated short film produced by Pixar Animation Studios. It is a parallel spin-off from Pixar's associated movie WALL-E. The titular repair robot of this short is a minor character from the movie, and this short is intercut with scenes from WALL-E, which takes place concurrently. WALL-Es director Andrew Stanton acted as co-writer and executive producer on BURN-E.

BURN-E was produced at the same time as WALL-E and was directed by the feature film's lead animator, Angus MacLane. The short movie is included as bonus material to the Blu-ray and DVD releases of WALL-E and has since also been aired on TV. BURN-E features music composed and conducted by J. A. C. Redford, who was also orchestrator on the film WALL-E.

The BURN-E robot appears briefly in WALL-E during the scene in which WALL-E and EVE dance in space. When they re-enter the Axiom, they accidentally lock him out, and he is last seen banging his fists against the door.

Plot
The short opens with a scene from the main film, in which WALL-E travels through space clinging to the ship carrying EVE back to the Axiom Executive Starliner. WALL-E runs his hand through the Rings of Saturn in passing, and dislodges a tiny rock, which gains enough momentum to become a meteor. It crashes into and destroys one of the running lights (known as "spires") on the Axiom's hull.

The Autopilot (AUTO) is alerted by the ship's computer of the needed repair, and activates a SUPPLY-R robot, who in turn activates BURN-E. He is given his welding torch and an intact spire, shuts down the broken spire, and travels via a special track onto the ship's hull to complete the repair. However, he is distracted by WALL-E's arrival, and inadvertently lets the spire float away into space. SUPPLY-R gives him a second one, but he accidentally cuts it in half when an exploding escape pod (which WALL-E was inside of) startles him.

Irritated by this second failure, SUPPLY-R drops the third and final spare light on the floor, leaving BURN-E to pick it up. He successfully repairs the light, but before he can bring it online, he is accidentally locked out by WALL-E and EVE, who fly indoors after a dance in space around the Axiom and close the door behind them.

BURN-E tries to find another way in, including through open garbage airlock, but all attempts fail. Finally, he realizes he can use his welding torch to cut a new entrance in the hull of the Axiom, and does so. However, he is flung back outside when the fight between the Captain and AUTO causes the ship to list violently to starboard. He catches hold of the spire, and is able to get back on his track as the ship turns upright again, but the Captain sends the Axiom into a hyperjump, pinning BURN-E against the hull before he can reenter the ship.

When the Axiom lands on Earth, BURN-E goes to find SUPPLY-R so he can hit the button to bring the spire back online, but everyone is gone. He hunts through the deserted Axiom, and finds the humans and robots are all outside when he looks through the window of an escape pod. He accidentally jettisons the pod, and crashes to Earth; flinging the pod door open so hard that it flies into the air, he runs to SUPPLY-R and finally brings the spire back online, only for the door to crash into the spire and destroy it. Frustrated, BURN-E collapses to the ground. The credits roll, to a recording of Beethoven's Ode to Joy.

In a post-credits scene, SUPPLY-R pats BURN-E on the head and attempts to comfort him with a monotone "There, there".

Cast 
 Angus MacLane as BURN-E
 Tessa Swigart as SUPPLY-R
 Ben Burtt as WALL-E (uncredited)
 Elissa Knight as EVE (uncredited)
 Jeff Garlin as Captain B. McCrea (uncredited)
 MacInTalk as AUTO (uncredited)

References

External links 

 

2008 films
2008 computer-animated films
2000s American animated films
2000s animated short films
2000s science fiction comedy films
American animated science fiction films
American robot films
American science fiction comedy films
Films set in the 29th century
Pixar short films
Animated films about robots
Films with screenplays by Andrew Stanton
WALL-E
Films directed by Angus MacLane
Films scored by J. A. C. Redford
2008 comedy films
2000s English-language films